The Core Knowledge Foundation is an independent, non-profit educational foundation founded in 1986 by E. D. Hirsch, Jr. The school curriculum created by the Foundation focuses on teaching students a foundation of knowledge at a young age; the desired outcome is that students will be better equipped for "effective participation and mutual understanding in the wider society."

As of April 2006, Core Knowledge schools were 44% public, 35% charter, 15% private, and 6% parochial. Additionally, they were 39% urban, 39% suburban, and 22% rural.

References

External links 
 Core Knowledge Foundation
 Core Knowledge UK

Education reform
Non-profit organizations based in Charlottesville, Virginia
Organizations established in 1986
1986 establishments in Virginia